Imagineering (from "imagination" and "engineering") is the implementation of creative ideas in practical form. The word was registered as a trademark of Disney Enterprises, Inc. in 1990, and forms part of the title of Disney's research and development arm, Walt Disney Imagineering. The word was actually coined by Alcoa around 1940, and appeared widely in numerous publications of several disciplines such as urban design, geography and politics, evolutionary economics, corporate culture and futures studies.

Earliest usages
During World War II, Alcoa created an internal "Imagineering" program to encourage innovative usage of aluminum in order to keep up with demand. A Time magazine ad from February 16, 1942, titled "The Place They Do Imagineering" relates the origin:

Other notable pre-Disney usages include an October 24, 1942, mention in the New York Times in an article titled "Christian Imagineering," a 1944 Oxford English Dictionary entry which cites an advertisement from the Wall Street Journal, and the use by artist Arthur Radebaugh to describe his work, which was mentioned in the article "Black Light Magic," in the Portsmouth Times, Portsmouth, Ohio, 1947.

Other early usage includes Richard F. Sailer's 1957 article "BRAINSTORMING IS IMAGINation enginEERING"  written for the National Carbon Company Management Magazine, and reprinted by the Union Carbide Company.

WED Enterprises applied for a trademark for the term in 1967, claiming first use in 1962.

In 1981, a book with the title Imagineering for Health: Self-Healing Through the Use of the Mind, authored by Serge King, was published by Quest Books (Wheaton, Illinois).

See also
Imagineer (disambiguation)

Other uses
"Imagineering" has also been used by:
 Master in Imagineering, NHTV Breda University of Applied Sciences Master's program.
 Imagineering Foundation, a charity organisation that encourages school children aged from 8–16 to engage with engineering.
 Imagineering, a defunct New Jersey video game developer.
 Imagineering Australia, a microcomputer software and hardware distributor founded by Australian businessman Jodee Rich.
 Larsen & Toubro (L&T), an Indian engineering and construction giant, in its advertising. It has been used in its ad campaign, released in mainline publications and on outdoor media nationwide describing the new tagline of the company - "It's all about Imagineering".
 Applied imagineering, used by Dr. Snyder in the United States Salvation Naval Academy. "The quantum concepts generated with our imaginations are applied with words and deeds. Applied Imagineering quantifies the constructs upon which students may attain enlightenment of self goals, self assess, and implementation of dreams into reality."

References

English words
Disney jargon
Engineering concepts